The P65 is a special purpose-built naturally aspirated DOHC V8 engine, designed, developed and produced by BMW, for sports car racing, between 2009 and 2016. It is based on the BMW S65 engine, used in the BMW M3 (E92) road car.

P65B44 
The P65 engine is used for motor racing.

Applications:
 2008 BMW M3 ALMS
 2009 BMW M3 GT2 racing car
 2010-2015 BMW Z4 GT3 racing car
 2013-2016 BMW Z4 GTE racing car

References

P65
V8 engines
Gasoline engines by model
Engines by model